Abthain (or abthane) is an English or Lowland Scots form of the middle-Latin word  (Gaelic ), meaning abbacy.

The word has special reference to the territories of the churches and monasteries founded by the old Celtic or Columban monks, mostly between the mountain chain of the Mounth and the Firth of Forth.

Many of these  passed into the hands of laymen, and were transmitted from father to son. They paid certain ecclesiastical tributes, and seem to have closely resembled the termonn lands of the early Irish Church.

See also

Crínán of Dunkeld
Lay abbot

Notes

Abbots
Catholic ecclesiastical titles
Christian religious occupations
Ecclesiastical titles
English words
Monasticism
Organisation of Catholic religious orders
Religious leadership roles
Religious terminology